Islamic state may refer to historical polities or theories of governance in the Islamic world or to a modern notion (dawla islamiyya) associated with political Islam.

Islamic state may also refer to:

 Islamic State of Afghanistan, the official name of the country Afghanistan from 1992 to 2001
 Transitional Islamic State of Afghanistan, transitional state after the fall of the Islamic State of Afghanistan in 2002
 Islamic State of Iraq (ISI), a Sunni jihadist group that aimed to establish an Islamic state in Iraq from 2006 to 2013
 Islamic State (IS), also known as the Islamic State of Iraq and Syria (ISIS) or the Islamic State of Iraq and the Levant (ISIL), or Daesh (based on its Arabic acronym), an outgrowth of ISI with a greater geographic scope
 Abu Sayyaf, also known as the Islamic State - East Asia Province
 Islamic State – Algeria Province
 Islamic State – Caucasus Province
 Islamic State – Central Africa Province
 Islamic State – Khorasan Province
 Islamic State – Sinai Province
 Islamic State – West Africa Province 
 Islamic State – Yemen Province
 Islamic State in the Greater Sahara 
 Islamic State in Libya
 Islamic State in Somalia 
 Azawad, a territory in Mali, also known as the Islamic State of Azawad
 Guardianship of the Islamic Jurist

See also
 Islamic republic
 Muslim world
 Caliphate
 Ummah
 Pan-Islamism